The Gates-Dell Complex (Bill and Melinda Gates Computer Science Complex and Dell Hall, abbreviated to GDC) is a building that houses the Computer Science department at the University of Texas at Austin. It was designed by Pelli Clarke Pelli, and completed in 2013 at a cost of $120 million. The building is named after Bill and Melinda Gates, and Susan and Michael Dell, who donated $30 million and $10 million, respectively, to the construction of the building.

The complex is organized into a north building and a south building, connected by a large glass atrium and a series of bridges.

References 

University of Texas at Austin campus
School buildings completed in 2013
2013 establishments in Texas